EFSD may refer to:

 European Foundation for the Study of Diabetes, a foundation created by the European Association for the Study of Diabetes (EASD)
 Elizabeth Forward School District, in Elizabeth, Pennsylvania, United States
 Education for sustainable development, EfSD
 Eurasian Fund for Stabilization and Development (former EURASEC Anti-crisis Fund), a fund of the Eurasian Development Bank